Joshua Johnson (born 26 September 2004) is an English professional footballer who plays as a midfielder for  club Oxford United.

Career
Johnson made his first-team debut for Oxford United at the age of sixteen, coming on as a 76th-minute substitute for Marcus McGuane in an EFL Cup first round tie at Burton Albion, and provided a pass to Anthony Forde that led to an Oxford goal. He played three further cup games in the 2021–22 campaign. On 23 August 2022, he started in a 2–0 defeat to Crystal Palace in an EFL Cup game at the Kassam Stadium; he said he enjoyed the match and thought the team supported him well. He signed his first professional two-year contract with the club the following month, describing it as a "dream come true". Manager Karl Robinson hailed him as a "terrific prospect". On 21 October, Johnson joined National League South club Dartford on a one-month loan.

Style of play
Johnson is a midfielder who can play the holding role or further forward.

Career statistics

References

2004 births
Living people
Black British sportsmen
English footballers
Footballers from Greater London
Association football midfielders
English Football League players
National League (English football) players
Fulham F.C. players
Oxford United F.C. players
Dartford F.C. players